HD 198404 (HR 7975) is a star in the equatorial constellation Delphinus. It has an apparent magnitude of 6.19, allowing it to be faintly seen with the naked eye.

HD 198404 has a simple stellar classification of K0, indicating that it is a K-type star. The star is metal enriched, having an iron abundance 48% greater than that of the Sun.

References

K-type giants
Delphinus (constellation)
Delphini, 21
BD+05 04626
198404
102833
7975